Amon George Liner (May 29, 1940 – July 26, 1976) was an American poet and playwright.

Early life and education
Amon Liner was born in Charlotte, North Carolina. He received a Bachelor of Arts degree in English from Kenyon College, and was elected to Phi Beta Kappa. He received a Master of Arts in drama from the University of North Carolina at Chapel Hill, where he was a member of the Dialectic Society. He also completed a Master of Fine Arts in creative writing from the University of North Carolina at Greensboro. He edited poetry for the Red Clay Reader, and was a book reviewer for The Charlotte Observer.

Career 
A severe congenital heart defect limited his physical exertion, and led to his death soon after the appearance of his second published work. The majority of his work was published posthumously by his friend and editor Judy Hogan of Carolina Wren Press. The Greensboro Review awards an Amon Liner poetry prize. In 2000, the Asheville Poetry Review named him one of 10 Great Neglected Poets of the 20th Century.

Liner had a fiercely devoted group of fellow poets, including Fred Chappell and Tom Huey. Liner's work especially embraces the relationships between artifacts and their creators. In an interview in the "New Voices" series produced by WUNC, Liner humorously contrasted himself with the "druidism" of poets who seemed to celebrate only uninhabited nature. Rather, he delighted in the poetic possibilities of technology, whether rusted cars, computers, or armaments. He never hesitated to demand of his readers a comprehensive knowledge of history, language, science and engineering. While recognizing the sometimes sad consequences of human creations, his tone was most often mischievous or contemplative.

The most monumental of Liner's work is the two volume The Far Journey and Final End of Dr. Faustwitz, Spaceman. Discovering immortality in the midst of a Nazi death camp, Dr. Faustwitz sets out to avenge evil by killing God. To amass power towards that end, Faustwitz gathers a crew for a journey through space, collecting wisdom from one planet after another. Through this journey, Liner explores every aspect of sense, conscience, science, technology, culture, language and nature to delve even more deeply into humanity than into the depths of space. The density of the language makes the ascent of the work Himalayan in magnitude, but the view you get is incomparable.

Liner's papers are archived at the UNC-Chapel Hill Southern Historical Collection.

Works
 Marstower (1972) Red Clay Publishers
 Contents: Auschwitz & Other Artifacts
 To Pythias from His Old Friend Damon
 Morning Stroll
 These, She Said, Are the Latter Times
 Within The Interval
 Too Many Eggs in the Quicksand
 Sleepwalk Voyage to the Crystal Land, the Golden Shores
 Don Juan Looks Back Upon Lot's Wife
 Divertimenti 22
 Towards a Definition of Pain
 Crucifixion Cube, Pre-Cubist
 Darkside of the Sun
 True Love Endures Through the Ages
 Statues Meeting
 Painblanket, Two Rows
 Micro/Meso/Macro Cosmology
 The Death of Meat
 Clocks, Squares, Fetuses & Glory Hands
 The Time Lag Between Blue and White
 God-Clone
 Desire Is Tonk
 Painting of Block-Style Sculpture
 Ode for the Blue Fox
 Time; or, The Philosophy of Silver & Yellow
 The Children of Ferocity
 "For Man, Love is Part of Life; But for Woman, Love Is the Whole of Life"
 Dirge for Ecumenical Liberalism
 Dirge for Poetic Liberalism
 Dirge for National Liberalism
 Dirge for Secular Reality
 Creativity, the Theosophy of the Film Critics
 Boswash
 Chrome Grass: Poems of Love and Burial (1975) Carolina Wren Press, Library of Congress Catalog Number 76-8750
 Contents: Preface
 Explanation of 4-Ply Format
 From the Depths of Pastoral Love
 Hero & the Lady / I
 Hero & the Lady / II
 Hero & the Lady / III
 Hero & the Lady / IV
 Television Love
 Climax!
 LoveLove; or, The Hope of Things To Come
 Exotic Nostalgia Love
 Love Assemblage
 PainLust; or, Elegy for the White Hats and Their Preferred Operational Mode of Love
 DeathDeath; or, The Love of Objects Objectified
 Burial Rites / I
 Burial Rites / II
 Burial Rites / III
 Rose, A Color of Darkness (1980) Carolina Wren Press 
 Contents: Rose, A Color of Darkness
 Review of a Conceptual Art Exhibition
 A Mondrian Poem On the Decline and fall of Greece, Chile, Brazil, Amerika, the Weimar Republic and the Language of Pellucidar
 Easy Wishes, Or the Old Nag Won't Go No More
 Accounting Autumn
 Live & Still Life
 There Is A Place To Go, I Feel
 Trying To Sail Beyond the Map
 Things That Are True of Blue
 Homage to Magritte
 Vergil's Finality: Voyage to the Center of July
 A Statement of Fact
 Why I Do Not Write Southern Poetry
 A Meditation on Faust
 On Being Shiftless
 Divertimenti 24
 Orpheus Again
 True Grit Speechifies to Funky Midnight Rider
 Gold Butter Won't Melt in the Golden Mouth
 Bright Dark
 Civic Religion
 Scene from After ABM
 Life Is Where You Find It
 20,000 Leagues Through the Peaceable Kingdom
 Mixed Company
 Inside the Belly of the Language
 Beyond the Yellow Brick Road
 Poets In the Age of Ford Or: All Maps and No Territory
 Churchill in Heaven
 Naked Singularity Routine
 language is a never
 death song
 Rose, A Color of Darkness
 Brief Historical Survey
 Brief Historical Survey
 Language: the Womb of Words
 Brain Revolution
 Polar Rhetoric: Star Death
 1975-1890
 Ol' Cracker Barrel Linguistical Analysuh Smokes a Cob on Love
 The Poem Is the Foundation of Its Language
 Another Ego and Its Own
 Game 3: A System Finding Game, With Subjectivities (As: History)
 Nostalgia Reality
 The Way of All Language
 Project for Ecology Zero
 And the Lst Shall be Bright
 We Are the Children God Warned Nietzsche Against
 A mirror which shall be nameless
 Linear Poem 04 from the Meta Realm
 Unbounded Direction Finding Game: or, Panopoly of the Machine Age
 Riders of the Purple Language
 Light Infantry Tactics
 Poems From Notebooks 1974 – 1976
 I do not know
 The Proper Attitude Toward Death / Variations LXXIII
 Mr. Smith Meets His Maker / Variations LXXXIX
 Ode To What Flourishes / Variations XCIII
 Lyric 1
 Lyric 2
 On the Power of Truth: a Parmenidean View
 a poem about grandmother and Spring / Variations CXX
 Variations CXXI
 Directions for Contact / Variations CXXXIII
 Lyric 7: Words For the Fathers
 Love Is a Somehow Thing
 The Age of Indifference: Part I / Variations CXLVI
 Love and the Well-Worded Rose / New Variations 9
 Parsifal & Co. / New Variations 11
 Meditation On Essential Innocence / Variations CLXXI
 A Pure Description / Variations CLXXII
 Our Exciting Language & How It Grew / Variations CLXXIV
 On Enlightened Detachment In An Impersonal Universe: or, How To Beat Inflation / Variations CLXXV
 Coda / Variations CLXXVI
 Variations CLXXIX
 The Rational Description of Metaphor / Variations CLXXX
 Ultimate Destination
 Variations CLXXXIII
 Variations CLXXXVI
 What You See Is What There Is / Variations CLXXXV
 Purity of Landscape / Variations CLXXXVII
 Dr. Faustwitz, Spaceman (1983) Carolina Wren Press, 
 Contents: Book I: Faustwitz At Auschwitz
 Book II: Immortality: Day One
 Book III: Faustwitz & the Planet of Love
 Book IV: Faustwitz & the Planet of Death
 Dr. Faustwitz, Spaceman (1988) Carolina Wren Press, 
 Contents: Book V: Faustwitz Explorer
 Book VI: Faustwitz Politician
 Book VII: Faustwitz Conqueror
 Book VIII: Faustwitz & the End of Earth
 Book IX: Faustwitz & Planet Omega
 Book X: Faustwitz-Hamilton
 Book XI: Faustwitz Destroyer
 Book XII: Faustwitz God

References

1940 births
1976 deaths
University of North Carolina at Chapel Hill alumni
Writers from Charlotte, North Carolina
Kenyon College alumni
20th-century American poets
20th-century American dramatists and playwrights